is a Japanese stage actress and voice actress from Ōta, Tokyo. She is a graduate of the College of Fine Arts at Nihon University. She then moved to Sigma Seven in 1991, and on July 1, 2003, she moved to her current agency, REMAX. From 1987 to the beginning of 1989 her roles were credited under her real name (渕崎 有里子) - the reading is unchanged.

Fuchizaki's roles often range from young boys to cute girls. Her representative roles include Retsu Seiba of Bakusou Kyoudai Let's & Go!!, Ibuki Yagami in Maison Ikkoku, Kazuma Tamura of Ojarumaru, Li Kohran in the Sakura Wars series, Anthy Himemiya in Revolutionary Girl Utena, and Loki in Mythical Detective Loki Ragnarok.

Filmography

Television animation
1984
Persia, the Magic Fairy (Kishin Shinokawa)
Panzer World Galient (Chururu)

1985
Pro Golfer Saru (Mashima Nekosuke)
 Musashi no Ken (Musashi Natsuki)

1986
Anmitsu Hime (Manjuu)
Doteraman (Onizou)
Pastel Yumi, the Magic Idol (Keshimaru)
Maison Ikkoku (Ibuki Yagami)

1987
The Three Musketeers  (Mimi)
Esper Mami (Noriko Momoi)
City Hunter (Nagisa Matsumura)

1988
Osomatsu-kun (Bara Nosei)

1989
Aoi Blink (Rakururu)
Obocchamakun (Tama No Koshi Tsuya Ko Sensei)
Patlabor (Satoru)
City Hunter 3 (Hitomi Takano)
The Adventures of Peter Pan (Michael)
Sally the Witch (1989) (Ayako)

1990
Tasuke, the Samurai Cop (Ninomiya Kintaro)
Oishinbo (Nishino Youko)
Anpanman (Kemurinu)
Chibi Maruko-chan (Hiroaki)
 (Polignac, Josephine)
Magical Angel Sweet Mint (Takuto, Waffle)
My Daddy Long Legs (Emily)

1991
Himitsu no Hanazono (Jiein)
Ekubo Ouji (Ekubo)
City Hunter '91 (Mami Asaka)
Jankenman (Genta)
Dororonpa! (Daifuku Tera Anko)
Magical Princess Minky Momo (Maria)
Watashi to Watashi: Futari no Lotte (Martin)
Warau Salesman (Ware Kan Machiko)

1992
Tomatoman (Meronpurinsu, Kon Jr.)
Sailor Moon (Sakiko)

1993
Ghost Sweeper Mikami (Chiho)
Little Women II: Jo's Boys (Rob)

1994
Tonde Burin (Tonrariano the 3rd, Narrator)
Soreike! Anpanman (Howaitokurimu Hime, Poporu)
Sailor Moon S (Cyprine)

1995
Zenki (Nasu Isshi)
Nurse Angel Ririka SOS (Dewey)
Bit the Cupid (Bit)

1996
Soreike! Anpanman (Kotecchan, Supana-kun)
Bakusō Kyōdai Let's & Go!! (Retsu Seiba)
Rurouni Kenshin (Young Sanosuke Sagara)

1997
Revolutionary Girl Utena (Anthy Himemiya)
Grander Musashi (Rozumari)
Ninpen Manmaru (Atsupirun)
Bakusou Kyoudai Let's & Go WGP  (Retsu Seiba)

1998
Oh My Goddess! (Megumi Morisato)
Ojarumaru (Kazuma Tamura, Obaasan, Shufu, Kodomo, Okusan, Joou Ari)
Bakusou Kyoudai Let's & Go MAX  (Retsu Seiba)

1999
Shuukan!! Storyland (Kobayashi Mayumi, Ooshima Senka)
Bomberman B-Daman Bakugaiden Victory (Hiroinbon)
Ojamajo Doremi (Mimi)

2000
Carried by the Wind: Tsukikage Ran (Sakura)
 Sakura Wars TV (Li Kohran)

2001
Shaman King (Melos)
Fruits Basket (Hiro Sohma)

2003
Gunslinger Girl (Patrizia)
Cheeky Angel (Yuusuke Yasuda)
Human Crossing (Someya Satoshi)
Pluster World (Tan-Q)
The Mythical Detective Loki Ragnarok (Loki)
Someday's Dreamers (Narrator of Instructional Video)

2004
Kochira Katsushika-ku Kameari Kōen-mae Hashutsujo (Jiruba Kasutanetto)
Shura no Mon (Oume)
Monster (Young Petr Capek)
Legendz (Halca Hepburn)

2005
The Snow Queen (Kurisuteine)

2006
Ah! My Goddess: Flights of Fancy  (Megumi Morisato)
Pretty Cure Splash Star (Moop, Michiru Kiryu)
We Were There (Yano's Mother)
Kaiketsu Zorori (Pepero)
Yōkai Ningen Bem (Kisaragi Ryouko)

2007
Dinosaur King  (Roto, Parapara)
Maple Story (Zukka)

2008
Ancient Ruler Dinosaur King DKidz Adventure: Pterosaur Legend  (Roto, Parapara, Tatsunoanmo, Darutanian)

2009
Kon'nichiwa Anne: Before Green Gables  (Miss Keru)

2011
Natsume's Book of Friends  (Menashi No Youkai)

2012
Digimon Xros Wars  (Bakomon)
Saint Seiya Omega  (Nguyen)

2013
Toriko  (Sen Ryu)
Case Closed  (Toba Hatsuho)

2016
Keijo!!!!!!!! (Ayako Sakashiro)

2017
The Art of 18 (Mari Kaneda)

Original video animation (OVA)
Bastard!! (Rushe Renren)
Gunbuster (Kimiko Higuchi)
Oh My Goddess!  (Megumi Morisato)
Plastic Little (Tita)
Sol Bianca (June Ashel)

Theatrical animation
Ah! My Goddess: The Movie (Megumi Morisato)
Akira (Kaori)
Crayon Shin-chan: Adventure in Henderland (Topema Mappet)
Kiki's Delivery Service  (Ket)
Night on the Galactic Railroad
Revolutionary Girl Utena: The Movie (Anthy Himemiya)

Video games
Arc the Lad III (Theo)
Azure Dreams (Patty, Weedy)
Dragon Force (Reinhart of Tradnor)
Eve: Burst Error (Misumi Kagawa)
Eve: Burst Error Plus (Misumi Kagawa)
Eve: Ghost Enemies (Misumi Kagawa)
Kingdom Hearts (Wendy Darling)
Klonoa 2: Lunatea's Veil (Leorina)
Klonoa Beach Volleyball (Leorina)
Klonoa Phantasy Reverie Series (Leorina)
Mario + Rabbids Sparks of Hope ( Rabbid Peach, JEANIE)
Puyo Puyo Fever 2 (Sig)
Puyo Puyo! 15th Anniversary (Sig)
Puyo Puyo 7 (Sig)
Puyo Puyo!! 20th Anniversary (Sig, Black Sig)
Puyo Puyo Tetris (Sig)
Sakura Wars Series (Li Kohran)
Shōjo Kakumei Utena: Itsuka Kakumeisareru Monogatari (Anthy Himemiya)
Sword of the Berserk: Guts' Rage (Puck)
Super Adventure Rockman (Cutman, Iceman)

Films
Typhoon Club (Midori Morisaki)

Dubbing

Live-action
The Blue Lagoon (1983 TBS edition), Young Emmeline (Elva Josephson)
Dune, Chani (Sean Young)
Hairspray, Tracy Turnblad (Nikki Blonsky)
Kramer vs. Kramer, Billy Kramer (Justin Henry)
The Lost World: Jurassic Park, Kelly Curtis (Vanessa Lee Chester)
Mac and Me, Courtney (Tina Caspary)
Scooby-Doo, Velma Dinkley (Linda Cardellini)
Scooby-Doo 2: Monsters Unleashed, Velma Dinkley (Linda Cardellini)
Scream, Tatum Riley (Rose McGowan)
Village of the Damned, David McGowen (Thomas Dekker)

Animation
Peter Pan, Wendy Darling

References

External links
 
 
Yuriko Fuchizaki at Ryu's Seiyuu Infos

1968 births
Living people
Japanese child actresses
Japanese video game actresses
Japanese voice actresses
Nihon University alumni
Voice actresses from Tokyo Metropolis
20th-century Japanese actresses
21st-century Japanese actresses